Samia Sarwar (1970 – 6 April 1999) was a Pakistani woman, who was shot dead in her lawyers' office in Lahore in an "honour killing."

Samia Sarwar was a married woman with two children, belonging to an affluent family of Peshawar. She claimed to have suffered marital abuse and eloped with Nadir Mirza, an army officer, leaving her children behind with her parents. The runaway couple cohabited for some days at a five-star hotel in Lahore before Nadir Mirza abandoned Sarwar and returned to his army posting. Samia then sought the help of the Lahore-based sisters Asma Jehangir and Hina Jilani, who are well-known human rights lawyers. Shortly afterwards, at a meeting between Samia and her mother at their chambers in Lahore, Samia was shot dead by an assassin hired by her own parents. They had arranged the murder of their daughter because they felt that she had brought shame upon the family by eloping with a lover, abandoning her husband and children, and making allegations of marital abuse to justify her misdeeds.

Background
Samia Sarwar was born into an affluent and educated family based in Peshawar, the capital of Pakistan's Khyber-Pakhtoonkhwa province. Her father, Ghulam Sarwar Khan Mohmand, was not only a successful industrialist but also a prominent public figure, being the President of the Khyber-Pakhtunkhwa Chamber of Commerce. Her mother, Sultana Sarwar, was a medical doctor with a successful practice in Peshawar.

Samia had been married for several years to a cousin, her mother's sister's son, and was the mother of two school-going children when the events described here unfolded. After a chance meeting at a party, Samia fell in love with an army captain named Nadir Mirza. After discussion with her lover, she filed a suit for divorce on the grounds that she was suffering violence and abuse at the hands of her husband. She filed the divorce papers in court secretly and then moved immediately to her parents' house, along with her children, supposedly for a brief visit. The reason given for the visit was that her children were enjoying school vacations and it was usual at this time for them to spend a few weeks with their grandparents. Once in her parents' house, she told them that she had already filed for divorce, and sought their support in the project of divorcing her husband and marrying Nadir Mirza. Upon their shocked refusal to support any such venture, and when it became clear that her parents were implacably opposed to the scheme, she abandoned her children and eloped with Nadir, her divorce unfinalized.

From Peshawar in Khyber-Pakhtunkhwa province, the runaway couple travelled overnight to Lahore in Punjab province. There, they stayed for some days at a five-star hotel, befitting Samia's affluent background, while her parents grew frantic in Peshawar. However, Samia and Nadir soon ran out of money, and she contacted some distant relatives, who lived in Lahore, to seek a loan. She did this in the knowledge that those relatives would be unaware of her elopement, since her family (from a sense of shame) would not have revealed the matter to anyone. However, the fact that she seemed to be alone in Lahore, and was asking for money, raised a red flag in the minds of those relatives. They phoned Samia's parents in a casual way and mentioned in passing that they were advancing the required money to her. This resulted in the whole matter becoming known, and the relatives told Samia's parents the name and location of the five-star hotel where she was staying. Samia's parents immediately contacted her by phone and had a stormy argument with her. They threatened her with dire consequences if she did not come back quietly, and also told her that if she came back immediately, the matter could still be hushed up, because they had not yet told anybody of the elopement. Above all, they told her to think about her children and their future.

At this point, Nadir Mirza returned to his work as an army captain in Peshawar, mindful that the Pakistani military took an extremely dim view of their officers cavorting with married women, and that he might even face a court martial for this misdemeanor. With money running short and no support forthcoming from relatives or others, either of money or shelter, Samia took refuge in Dastak, a shelter for women in Lahore. She particularly chose Dastak because that shelter was run by Asma Jehangir, a staunch feminist and left wing activist. At Dastak, Samia knew she would receive not just food and shelter but also free legal counsel and active support for her wish to break up her marriage and marry her lover.

Death
After being informed that Samia had taken refuge at Dastak, her mother sought permission to meet her and discuss matters with her. She stated that she was intensely worried about her daughter, and that meeting and conversing with Samia may help her and the rest of the family to understand these recent events, and possibly accept Nadir Mirza, if he was still interested in Samia. Based on this understanding, Samia agreed to meet her mother at the offices shared by her two lawyers and mentors, the sisters Asma Jehangir and Hina Jilani. She however stipulated that her father and brothers, who she knew were intensely hostile towards her after recent events, should not come to the meeting, and that her mother alone was to come.

Samia's mother came to the meeting accompanied by a man whom Samia did not recognize. He was there ostensibly to chauffeur Samia's mother and to help that aged and frail lady climb the stairs, since Samia's brothers were forbidden from being there to help her. Once they were inside the lawyer's office, the man pulled out a gun and shot Samia dead at point-blank range.

Aftermath 
Nadir Mirza faced an army enquiry and was dismissed "in disgrace" from the army for irresponsible behavior "unbecoming of an army officer." He left the country soon afterwards. He now lives in Britain, and is married with two children.

Despite public protests and demonstrations, nobody received punishment for the crime. This is because the Pakistani penal code recognizes the Islamic practices of Qisas and Diyya, where the next-of-kin of a victim can accept restitution and grant forgiveness to the culprit. In that case, the Pakistani state does not press charges even for otherwise cognizable offences like murder. Samia's father, being her Wali or first-ranking kin, forgave the assassin and also his accomplice (being Samia's mother).

The two left-wing activists, the feminist lawyers Hina Jilani and Asma Jehangir, were threatened with death for their defense of Samia. The death threats were issued by a number of religious groups, most notably the Jamiat Ulema-e-Islam. Ironically, Ms. Jehangir is also the United Nations Special Rapporteur on Extra-Judicial Killings.

In the Pakistani Senate 
After the murder, Senator Syed Iqbal Haider of the Pakistan Peoples Party, supported by nineteen fellow Senators, framed a resolution condemning the practice  of 'honour killings.' Iqbal had to amend the wording of the proposed resolution four times, as supporting Senators became fewer. On the day when the bill was to be tabled in the Senate, a majority of that House opposed the introduction, Senator Ajmal Khattak stating that when it is a question of 'honour,' there is no room even for discussion. Chairman Wasim Sajjad (a Rhodes Scholar) ruled that there could be no discussion on the matter. As a result, the resolution was not even tabled in the house.

In media 
A BBC documentary, Licence to Kill, covered Samia and some other honour killing cases which occurred in Pakistan. It was first broadcast on March 25, 2000 and won the RTS 2001 award for Best TV journalism. Licence to Kill is the follow-up to 1999's documentary, Murder in Purdah, on the killing of women in Pakistan. While 'Murder in Purdah' showed how casually women are killed in Pakistan, 'Licence to Kill' shows how state institutions endorse such killings and allow the killers to escape without punishment. Both films were selected for cinema screening at the Human Rights Watch Film Festival in London March 2000.

The BBC programme comments that "The Pakistan Penal Code, amended in 1990 to embrace Islamic principles, has made it easier for those who kill women to get away with it". This is because Sharia, the Islamic principles of law, practices Qisas on cases of murder. The concept of Qisas views a murder as a crime against the victim's family, not the State. This means that the victim's next of kin can forgive a murder if they choose to. So if a woman's family are complicit in killing her, then other family members, as next of kin, can legally forgive those complicit.

See also 
 Honour killing in Pakistan
 2012 Kohistan video case
 Qandeel Baloch
 Stoning of Farzana Parveen
 Death of Samia Shahid
 Ayman Udas

References

1970 births
1999 deaths
Honour killing in Pakistan
Honor killing victims
People murdered in Lahore
People from Peshawar
Pashtun people
Incidents of violence against women
1999 murders in Pakistan
Violence against women in Pakistan
Filicides